Clyde Dillard Minter (October 15, 1921December 21, 1971) was an American stock car racing driver. Minter competed in 42 NASCAR Grand National Series races between 1949 and 1955, where he reached the top ten a total of 19 times. Minter died on December 21, 1971 and is buried at Roselawn Burial Park in Martinsville, Virginia.

References

External links
 
 

1921 births
1971 deaths
NASCAR people
NASCAR drivers
People from Virginia
People from Martinsville, Virginia
Racing drivers from Virginia